Formigal, officially Aramón Formigal-Panticosa, is a ski resort in the Aragon Pyrenees of northeastern Spain, near the town of Sallent de Gallego in the upper Tena Valley in the province of Huesca.  The nearest international airports are in Zaragoza, Spain and Lourdes, France.

The resort
Formigal-Panticosa has  of marked pistes.

From there an 8-seat chairlift provides the main access for the resort. Prior to 2004 this access was provided by a gondola, informally called "El huevo" (The egg) by its users. The resort itself occupies fuve different high mountain valleys, defining three sectors: Tres Hombres (Sextas), Izas-Sarrios, Anayet, El Portalet and "Panticosa". Each valley is accessible by car and a bus service, with a parking and service area at its base from where the chair lifts depart.

Formigal-Panticosa hosted the FIS Alpine Junior World Ski Championships in 2008, held in late February.

Lifts
Most of the resort's 37 lifts are modern and of high capacity:

 1 eight-seat chairlift
 1 eight-seat cable car
 5 six-seat chairlifts
 9 four-seat chairlifts
 3 two-seat chairlift
 10 carpet lifts
 10 ski lifts

Pistes
The resort offers a variety of terrain on 147 pistes:

 - 12 beginner
 - 36 easy
 - 52 intermediate
 - 42 expert
5 Route
1 Snowpark

Services
 8 restaurants
 2 ski school
 2 snow gardens for children
 2 kindergarten
 5 ski hiring stores

References

External links
 
 Spain.info - national tourism site - Formigal ski resort - 
 Ski Map.org - trail map - Formigal - 2009
 The Telegraph - video - Formigal in Spain

Ski areas and resorts in Aragon
Pyrenees